Let It Reign is the debut studio album by English rock band Carl Barât and The Jackals. It was released on 16 February 2015 through Cooking Vinyl.

Critical reception
Let it Reign has a score of 67 on review aggregator Metacritic, indicating "generally favorable reviews".

Track listing

Personnel
Carl Barât and the Jackals
Carl Barât - vocals, guitar
Ray Suen - bass
Jarrod Alexander - drums
with:
Alfredo Ortiz - percussion
Billy Tessio - guitar on "We Want More" and "The Gears"
Drew McConnell - bass on "We Want More" and "The Gears"
Jay Bone - drums on "We Want More" and "The Gears"
Andrew Wyatt - piano on "Let It Rain"
Sara Bauza - trumpet on "Victory Gin" and "War on the Roses"
Joby J. Ford - additional backing vocals on "Summer in the Trenches" and "Beginning to See"

References

2015 debut albums
Carl Barât albums
Cooking Vinyl albums